Witchery is a Swedish thrash metal band.

Witchery may also refer to:

 "Witchery (song)", a 1977 song by Australian group Little River Band
 Witchery (company), an Australian chain store
 Witchery (film), a 1988 Italian horror film
 Witchery (magic), the use of magical powers and spells